Nandiala is a town in the Nandiala Department of Boulkiemdé Province in central western Burkina Faso. It is the capital of the Nandiala Department and has a population of 10,711.

References

Populated places in Boulkiemdé Province